Bron (from Dutch for "source, spring") is a surname. Notable people with the surname include:

Bas Bron (born 1974), Dutch musician
Blaise Bron (1918–2004), Swiss artist
Coenraad Bron (1937–2006), Dutch computer scientist
Eleanor Bron (born 1938), British actress and author
Gerry Bron (1933–2012), British record producer
Jean-Stéphane Bron (born 1969), Swiss film director
Kenneth Bron (Kenny B, born 1961), Surinamese-born singer
Zakhar Bron (born 1947), Russian violinist

Dutch toponymic surnames